Laura Pausini is Italian singer Laura Pausini's Spanish-language debut album and her third studio album issued by CGD (Warner) Records in 1994. This self-titled work offers Spanish-language renditions of selected tracks and greatest hits from her native Italian-language albums Laura Pausini (1993) and Laura (1994).

To celebrate the 25th anniversary of the album, a special box was released exclusively in Spain on 8 November 2019, which consists of the standard album with two bonus tracks: "Besos que se Roban", Spanish version of "Baci che si rubano" and a 2013 medley: "La Solitudine / La Soledad / Loneliness", a second disc with the 10 Italian original versions, a third disc with alternative and live versions, a DVD of a 1995 TV special called Un Año de Éxito, the album in 180-g translucent vinyl format, a 36-page booklet with texts by the singer and Risto Mejide, and never-seen photographic material.

Track listing 
All Spanish adaptations by J. Badía, with additional English adaptation by Tim Rice in "Loneliness".

Charts

Year-end charts

Certifications 

|-
!scope="row"|Chile (IFPI Chile)
|Platinum
|25,000^
|-
!scope="row"|Colombia (ASINCOL)
|Platinum
|60,000x
|-

Personnel

Performing 
Laura Pausini – vocals
Emanuela Cortesi – backing vocals
Silvia Mezzanotte – backing vocals
Cristina Montanari – backing vocals
Leonardo Abbate – backing vocals
Danilo Bastoni – backing vocals
Gianni Salvatori – backing vocals, acoustic/electric guitar, arrangement
Riccardo Galardini – acoustic/electric guitar
Cesare Chiodo – bass
Stefano Allegra – bass
Massimo Pacciani – drums/percussion
Simone Papi – piano, programming
Luca Signorini – saxophone

Technical 
Arcangelo Valsiglio – artistic production
Marco Marati – executive production
Alfredo Cerruti – artistic production assistance
Fabrizio Pausini – executive production assistance
Santanna Recording Studio
Danilo Bastoni – studio director
Gianni Salvatori – sound recording
Sandro Chinellato – sound recording
Morning Studio
Renato Cantele – sound recording
Giamba Lizzori – sound recording

Design 
Byblos – wardrobe
Luciano Viti  – photography
Stefania Tranchino – make-up
Fabrizio Betty by I Maretti – hairdressing

See also 
 List of best-selling Latin albums
 List of best-selling albums in Spain

References 

Other sources
 "Song Search". Warner Chappell Music (Italy). Accessed 24 August 2007.

1994 albums
Laura Pausini albums
Spanish-language albums
Compagnia Generale del Disco albums